Diplomystes is a genus of velvet catfishes, a primitive family of catfishes (order Siluriformes) endemic to Chile.

Species 
There are currently three recognized species in this genus:
 Diplomystes camposensis Arratia, 1987
 Diplomystes chilensis (Molina, 1782) (Tollo)
 Diplomystes nahuelbutaensis Arratia, 1987

See also
List of fish families

References

Diplomystidae
 
Catfish genera
Freshwater fish genera

Endemic fauna of Chile
Taxa named by Pieter Bleeker